Horst Christopeit (born 15 August 1939) is a retired German football goalkeeper.

Career

Statistics

References

External links
 

1939 births
Living people
German footballers
VfL Bochum players
SC Preußen Münster players
Association football goalkeepers